Long intergenic non-protein coding RNA 511 is a protein that in humans is encoded by the LINC00511 gene.

References

Further reading 

 

Non-coding RNA